Cameroon Basketball Federation (CBF) is a non-profit organization and the governing body for basketball in Cameroon. The organization represents the Cameroon in FIBA and the men's and women's national basketball teams in the Cameroon Olympic Committee.

History
Cameroon Basketball Federation was founded in 1961 as Cameroon National Basketball Federation (CNBF). And remained as the CNBF until 1965 when it joined FIBA.

References

External links
 Official website (French)

National members of FIBA Africa
Basketball in Cameroon
Basketball
Sports organizations established in 1961
1961 establishments in Cameroon